Zarrar is a 2022  Pakistani spy action thriller film written and directed by Shaan Shahid and produced by Ejaz Shahid and Adnan Butt under the banner of Jehan Films. It stars Shaan Shahid as the titular character along with Kiran Malik, Nadeem Baig, Nayyer Ejaz and Shafqat Cheema in supporting roles. The film was officially released worldwide on November 25, 2022.

The idea for 'Zarrar' initially began in 2016, and is considered to be Pakistan's second spy thriller action film after the release of 2014's O21.

Plot
A secret agent named, Zarrar (Shahid) has gone rogue after his homeland, Pakistan has been plunged with corruption when he finds out that a secret international operation has plans to dismantle the Pakistani government and subsequently gain control of its Nuclear Weapons Programme. Aiming to end the seemingly endless cycle of threats, he gets help from a close friend, Colonel Mustajab (Baig). With time running out, Zarrar must act fast in terminating the greatest threat Pakistan has come up against since its inception.

Cast 
 Shaan Shahid as Zarrar: A former secret agent gone rouge.
 Kiran Malik as Kiran: A journalist and love interest of Zarrar.
 Nadeem Baig as Major General Mustajab of the ISI, the mentor of the protagonist.
 Shafqat Cheema as Ravinder Kaushik
 Rasheed Naz as Fahimullah Khan
 Nayyar Ejaz as Salman Shah as the main antagonist.

Release 
It was released on 25 November 2022. It was originally set for release sometime in 2020 but was delayed due to the COVID-19 pandemic. The film was then moved to release on September 23, 2022, but was moved from that date due to the 2022 Pakistan Floods. After multiple delays, the film was then moved to its current release date in November.

Production

Development 
Development of the project started in 2016 when behind the scene shots of the film were shared by Shaan himself.

UK based Director of Photography (DOP) Tim Wood was hired for the project.

Shaan had chosen Pinewood Studios UK, for the post production of the film after which he did with his earlier film, Arth - The Destination which was a remake of the original Arth.

See also
 List of Pakistani films of 2022
 List of highest-grossing Pakistani films
 Cinema of Pakistan
 Lollywood

References

External links 
 
 

Pakistani action films
2020s Urdu-language films
Lollywood films
Unreleased Pakistani films
Upcoming films
Pakistani spy thriller films